The Beauty Jungle (also known as Contest Girl) is a 1964 British film directed by Val Guest.

Plot
Shirley lives in Bristol. While on a seaside holiday at Butlins holiday camp a young typist Shirley Freeman (Janette Scott) is persuaded by a local journalist Don MacKenzie (Ian Hendry) to enter a beauty contest. When she wins, she decides to give up her previous career and life and take up entering beauty contests full-time. Her parents disown her.

Shirley comes second in a heat for the "Rose of England" contest, but her friend points out to the judges that the winner has not followed the rules and she is disqualified so Shirley wins by default, winning £300 and a trip to Monte Carlo. They enjoy the trip together, but Don changes the booking at the hotel from two single rooms to one double room. Whilst in Monte Carlo she enters yet another beauty contest, "Miss Trapeze", this is a chaotic contest set in a circus, but nevertheless she wins, winning 500NF. The contest organisers Mr Carrick and Mr Armand invite them to dinner.

Returning to Britain she does a photo-shoot in Torquay with photographer Walter Carey (Ronald Fraser). She then enters the final of "Miss Rose of England" and wins, winning £1000.

She is then entered as "Miss England" in the "Miss Globe" contest held on the Cote d'Azur. Here Don has to stay at a different hotel and Shirley has to share a hotel room with Miss Peru, but she comes only 6th despite naively sleeping with one of the male judges the night before the contest. Disillusioned with the beauty profession she stops entering beauty contests completely.

Later on, after being required as reigning champion to judge a beauty contest in the UK, she sees that her younger sister Elaine (Janina Faye) has entered the contest and just
immediately walks away completely from the beauty profession and all of its hypocrisy and sordid publicity stunts.

Cast
Ian Hendry as Don Mackenzie
Janette Scott as Shirley Freeman
Ronald Fraser as Walter Carey 
Edmund Purdom as Rex Carrick 
Jean Claudio as Armand
Kay Walsh as Mrs. Freeman 
Tommy Trinder as Charlie Dorton
Norman Bird as Mr. Freeman 
Janina Faye as Elaine
Aliza Gur as Miss Perù
David Weston as Harry       
Peter Ashmore as Lucius 
Sid James as Butlin Judge (as "Sydney James")
Jacqueline Jones as Jean Watson 
Jackie White as Barbara Lawton 
Jerry Desmonde as Swimming Pool MC 
Alan Taylor as TV Commentator 
Eve Eden as Angela Boynton 
Lionel Blair as Talk of the Town Producer 
Francis Matthews as Taylor
Nikki Peters as Cora 
Raymond Young as "Miss Globe" host
Margaret Nolan as Caroline
Arlette Dobson as Miss America
Donna Pearson as Miss Sweden
Sandy Sarjeant as Miss Spain
Barbara von der Heyde as Miss Germany
 Paul Carpenter as American Tourist
 Donald Hewlett as Advertising Man
Former Miss World Rosemarie Frankland makes her screen debut in a guest appearance.
Norman Hartnell, Lydia Russell, Duchess of Bedford, Stirling Moss, Linda Christian, and Joe Brown appear as themselves judging the Rose of England at the Talk of the Town.

Production
Weston-super-Mare (including the now-demolished lido), Butlins Bognor Regis and the Redcliffe area of Bristol were amongst the filming locations.

References

External links

 

1964 films
1964 drama films
CinemaScope films
British drama films
1960s English-language films
Films shot at Pinewood Studios
Films directed by Val Guest
Films about beauty pageants
Films shot in Bristol
Films shot in Somerset
Films shot in West Sussex
1960s British films